The Sala Lancisiana is a renaissance building located in Rome, part of the hospital of San Giacomo degli Incurabili, and site of an anatomical theatre. It was built at the end of the 16th century by the architect Francesco Capriani at the behest of Cardinal Anton Maria Salviati, and named after the physician Giovanni Maria Lancisi.

Description 

The entrance looks out onto Via di Ripetta and is characterised by a two-tiered symmetrical façade in renaissance style, bearing a Latin inscription commemorating its construction in 1593:Ant. M. Salviatus Ep. incohavit idemq. Card. perfecit MDLXXXIV. The interior has a circular plan with concentric wooden seats, the ogival ceiling is decorated with frescoes.

History 
It was built at the behest of Cardinal Anton Maria Salviati in 1593 as part of the reconstruction of the Ospedale di San Giacomo degli Incurabili by the architect Francesco Capriani.

The building was used as an anatomical theatre in 1780 by the decree of Pope Pius VI. It was named after the physician Giovanni Maria Lancisi, founder of the Lancisian Academy. It was the seat of surgical teaching in 1780, and seat of the chair of surgery established by Pius VII in 1815.

Later it hosted conferences on medical and science topics. It was eventually used as morgue. In modern times it has also been called Aula di Malta.

Gallery

Bibliography 

 
 Enrico Fedele, L'Ospedale San Giacomo in Augusta tra storia, assistenza e cultura (PDF), in Annali Italiani di Chirurgia, vol. 74, n. 2, 2003. Retrieved 14 September 2020.

See also 

 Ospedale di San Giacomo degli Incurabili
 Teatro anatomico
 Accademia Lancisiana

References

Renaissance architecture in Rome
Anatomical theatres
Coordinates not on Wikidata